Tomáš Weber (born 26 May 1996) is a Czech football player who currently plays for Fotbal Třinec in the Czech National Football League.

Personal life
He was born in Vyškov, where his father, a former football player Jozef Weber, played for FK Drnovice.

Football career

Early career
Than his family moved to Jablonec where he started playing football for FK Jablonec. In his 15 years he moved to Brno.

References

External links
 Profile at FC Zbrojovka Brno official site
 Profile at MSFL official site
 

1996 births
Living people
Czech footballers
FK Jablonec players
FC Zbrojovka Brno players
SK Líšeň players
1. SC Znojmo players
MFK Karviná players
FK Fotbal Třinec players
Czech First League players
Czech National Football League players
Association football midfielders
People from Vyškov
Sportspeople from the South Moravian Region